The Contrivances is a 1715 comedy play by the British writer Henry Carey. A farce, it produced was an afterpiece to follow on from a revival of Bonduca.

The original Drury Lane cast included Henry Norris as Argus, James Quin as Rovewell, Joe Miller as Robin, Richard Cross as Constable and Mary Willis as Arethusa.

References

Bibliography
 Burling, William J. A Checklist of New Plays and Entertainments on the London Stage, 1700-1737. Fairleigh Dickinson Univ Press, 1992.
 Van Lennep, W. The London Stage, 1660-1800: Volume Two, 1700-1729. Southern Illinois University Press, 1960.

1715 plays
West End plays
Plays by Henry Carey
Comedy plays